The Old High Court Building in Dhaka is situated at High Court Street, opposite the picturesque Curzon Hall. It was constructed in the beginning of the 20th century in Renaissance architectural style. It served as an official residence and governmental office before coming the High Court Building after the division of India in 1947.

Architectural significance 

This is the finest example in Dhaka of the European Renaissance style with few or no Mughal features. It has a prominent central porch under a triangular pediment which is supported on Corinthian columns. The building is surmounted by a graceful dome which rests on a ring of columns.  On entering the building through this porch there are two wide verandahs on either side of the 28 foot square entrance hall, which is paved with white marble. Beyond is a broad staircase, also flagged with white marble which leads to the upper storey. On the west of the entrance hall are a couple of drawing rooms of similar dimensions, measuring 25 by 34 feet, and these rooms are terminated by a north–south oriented verandah and a long corridor around a large rectangular inner courtyard. On the east, there is a ball room which measures 60 by 55’-0” and is fronted by a verandah on the south. The inner central courtyard is overlooked on both the east and west wings by long covered corridors and a circular projection in the centre of each wing, whilst the two-storeyed northern wing facing south, accommodates four large bedrooms measuring 28’-0” x 17”-8” and 25’-0” x 16”-0” with dressing rooms and bathrooms between them. These also are flanked by two 9’-8” wide verandahs on both the front and back. A staircase through the middle of the north wing leads to the upper storey. There are two spiral staircases at the corners of the quadrilateral blocks. The entire flooring on the ground floor is of white marble except for ballroom which is of polished teak timber planks. The edifice presents a graceful example of the European Renaissance style as adapted to suit this country.

Present condition 

It is now under the control of Supreme Court. Now it is divided into two parts, one part is being used for crime tribunal and the other part for law commission.

Address 

The Old High Court is situated at High Court Street, opposite the picturesque Curzon Hall, and skirting the Ramna Green, Dhaka.

References 
 Ahmed Nazimuddin, Edited by Sanday John, Buildings Of The British Raj In Bangladesh, p. 41, University Press Limited
 McAdam Marika, Lonely Planet Bangladesh (Country) Travel (Guide), p. 50, Published By Lonely Planet, 5th ed
 Mamun Muntasir, Dhaka Smirti Bismritir Nagari, p. 154, Published by Monirul Hoque, 4th ed, January 2004

Further reading 
 

Old Dhaka
Buildings and structures in Dhaka
Courthouses